Mohamed Mohamoud Handule was a Somali diplomat. He died at Moscow in 2016.

Career
Handule was the Ambassador Extraordinary and Plenipotentiary of the Federal Republic of Somalia to the Russian Federation. He presented his Letter of Credence to then-President of Russia Vladimir Putin on 27 July 2007.

References 

Year of birth missing (living people)
Living people
Ambassadors of Somalia to Russia
Ethnic Somali people
Somalian diplomats